Pixelmator is a graphic editor developed for macOS by Lithuanian brothers Saulius and Aidas Dailide, and built upon a combination of open-source and macOS technologies. Pixelmator features selection, painting, retouching, navigation, and color correction tools; as well as layers-based image editing, GPU-powered image processing, color management, automation, and a transparent head-up display user interface for work with images. Pixelmator uses Core Image and OpenGL technologies that use the Mac's video card for image processing.

Pixelmator was the first commercial image editor to fully support the WebP image format on Mac.

Features 
 Uses technologies like Core Image and Automator.
 Photoshop images with layers are supported as well as other popular still image file formats.
 Uses layers-based editing.
 Over 40 tools for selecting, cropping, painting, retouching, typing, measuring and navigation.
 Shape tools.
 16 color correction tools and over 50 filters.
 Integrates with macOS and applications such as Photos and Aperture.
 Pictures can be taken with a FaceTime camera from within the app.
 Quick file conversion can be done with the help of Automator actions.
 macOS ColorSync and ColorSync profiles are supported.
 Support for Mac OS X Lion features such as versions, auto save, and full screen mode.
Compatibility with MacOS Catalina, including support for Sidecar (a dual-screen tool for iPad users) and Apple Pencil as of version 1.5 (released October 10, 2019).
 Editing video adjustments like colors, masks, and effects similar to how photos are edited.

Limitations

Pixelmator doesn't support image stitching for multi-exposure HDR capture, focus stacking, or panoramic photography.

Version history

Pixelmator for Mac

See also 
Comparison of raster graphics editors
Affinity Photo

References

External links 
 

Raster graphics editors
MacOS graphics software
MacOS-only software